Hu Yuan (Chinese: 胡瑗, 993-1059), courtesy name Yizhi (Chinese: 翼之). Born in Hailing, Taizhou (today's Taizhou, Jiangsu). Since he lived in the Fort Anding in the modern-day Zichang County, he was also called "Mr. Anding" (Chinese: 安定先生, Ān dìng xiān sheng).

An educator from the Northern Song Dynasty, he was considered one of the so called "Three masters of the beginning of the Song Dynasty" (宋初三先生). As an educator, he privileged the understating of the substance and function (Chinese: 體用) and literature (Chinese: 文) as the way of the sages.

He was also considered one of the forerunners of Neo-Confucianism, was a teacher of Cheng Yi, and wrote a comment on the Yijing. Zhu Xi regarded him as a relatively important Confucian of the Song Dynasty

He was the ancestor of Hu Dunfu.

References 

Song dynasty philosophers

993 births
1059 deaths
Song dynasty classicists